H.H. Raja Sir Jashwant Singh II K.C.I.E. (1864–1919) was the ruler of the princely state of Sailana State, India from year 1895 to 1919.

He was the son of Bhawani Singh of Semlia, a jagirdar of Sailana State and a distant cousin of Raja Dule Singh of Sailana. He was educated in the Rajkumar College, Indore. Succeeded on the death of his father to the Semlia jagir of Sailana in 1876.

Jaswant Singh was adopted by Raja Dule Singh and was made the Yuvaraj (Crown prince) of Sailana in 1884 (recognised by the GOI, 1885). He transferred Semlia to his younger brother in 1888. Appointed as Administrator of Sailana in 1893, and assumed responsibility for the government. Succeeded on the death of his adopted father on 11 October 1895. Ascended the gadi, at the Raj Mahal, Sailana, 13 October 1895. Invested with full ruling powers, 23 December 1895.

Jaswant Singh II inherited a state which was struck by poverty, corruption and famine. He introduced many reforms and brought the state to a level of a model administration.

He received the Gold Kaiser-i-Hind Medal in 1901 for his efficient work during the famine in 1900, Delhi Durbar gold medals of 1903 & 1911 and was created KCIE in 1904. He served as president of Akhil Bharatiya Kshatriya Mahasabha in 1911.

He died in 1919 and was succeeded by his son Dileep Singh.

References

1864 births
1919 deaths
Knights Commander of the Order of the Indian Empire
Indian royalty
Indian knights
Recipients of the Kaisar-i-Hind Medal